Zachary Vincent LeDay (born May 30, 1994) is an American professional basketball player for Partizan Belgrade of the Serbian KLS, the Adriatic League and the EuroLeague. He played college basketball for the University of South Florida and Virginia Tech. At a height of 2.02 m (6'7 ") tall, and a weight of 107 kg (235 lbs.), LeDay primarily plays at the power forward and center positions.

Early life and college career
LeDay attended Skyline High School in Dallas, then transferred for his senior year to The Colony High School in The Colony, Texas.

LeDay played two years at South Florida, where he averaged 3.4 points and 2.5 rebounds in his sophomore year. On June 4, 2014, LeDay transferred from South Florida to Virginia Tech, but sat out first season at Virginia Tech per NCAA transfer rules.

In his senior year at Virginia Tech, LeDay averaged 16.4 points, 7.3 rebounds and 1.2 assists per game. He under new coach Buzz Williams led Virginia Tech to first NCAA tournament in 10 years.

On March 12, 2017, LeDay was named to the ACC All-Tournament Second Team.

He participated in the Portsmouth Invitational Tournament following his senior season, averaging 18.9 points and 9.6 rebounds in three games played. LeDay was named to the Portsmouth Invitational Tournament All-Tournament First Team.

Professional career

Hapoel Gilboa Galil (2017–2018)
On July 27, 2017, LeDay signed with the Israeli team Hapoel Gilboa Galil for the 2017–18 season. On December 9, 2017, LeDay recorded a double-double of 22 points and 20 rebounds in a 72–71 win over Hapoel Jerusalem, becoming the first player to record a 20-point, 20-rebounds game in the Israeli Premier League since Diamon Simpson in 2014. He was subsequently named Israeli League Round 9 MVP. On March 2, 2018, LeDay participated in the Israeli League All-Star Game and the Slam Dunk Contest during the same event.

During his season with Gilboa Galil, LeDay was named two-time Israeli League Player of the Month (for games played in December and April). LeDay helped Gilboa Galil reach the 2018 Israeli League Playoffs, where they eventually lost to Hapoel Jerusalem. LeDay finished the season as the league second-leading scorer with 19.5 points per game, second in efficiency rating with 23.0 per game and fifth in rebounds with 8.2 per game.

On June 8, 2018, LeDay earned a spot in the All-Israeli League First Team.

Olympiacos (2018–2019)
On June 29, 2018, LeDay joined the Atlanta Hawks for the 2018 NBA Summer League.

On July 7, 2018, LeDay signed a three-year deal with the Greek team Olympiacos of the EuroLeague. On November 30, 2018, LeDay recorded a season-high 28 points, shooting 9-of-11 from the field, along with eight rebounds and two steals in a 90–72 win over Budućnost, becoming the first player in the EuroLeague who recorded 42 PIR in 21 minutes. He was subsequently named EuroLeague Round 10 MVP. LeDay took part in 25 Greek League games with 11.2 points and 4.8 rebounds per game.

On July 5, 2019, LeDay parted ways with Olympiacos.

Žalgiris (2019–2020)
On July 27, 2019, LeDay signed a 1+1-year deal with Žalgiris Kaunas of the Lithuanian Basketball League. On October 17, 2019, LeDay recorded 26 points, shooting 10-of-14 from the field, along with nine rebounds, two assists and one steal, leading Žalgiris to an 86–73 win over Real Madrid. LeDay averaged 11.8 points, 4.7 rebounds, and 1.0 assists per game. On July 13, 2020, LeDay officially parted ways with the Lithuanian club.

Olimpia Milano (2020–2021)
On July 13, 2020, he signed with Olimpia Milano of the Lega Basket Serie A (LBA) and the EuroLeague. At the end of the season, despite some excellent performances and helping his team to the 2021 EuroLeague Final Four where Milano finished in third place (10 points and 4.6 rebounds per contest, in 36 games, shooting with 46.6% from beyond the arc) LeDay mutually consented with Milano to part ways on July 6, 2021.

Partizan Belgrade (2021–present) 
On July 6, 2021, he signed a two-year deal with Partizan of the ABA League and the EuroCup.

Career statistics

EuroLeague

|-
| style="text-align:left;"| 2018–19
| style="text-align:left;"| Olympiacos
| 30 || 2 || 17.0 || .538 || .357 || .781 || 4.0 || .3 || .3 || .4 || 9.7 || 10.8
|- class="sortbottom"
| style="text-align:center;" colspan=2| Career
| 30 || 2 || 17.0 || .538 || .357 || .781 || 4.0 || .3 || .3 || .4 || 9.7 || 10.8

Personal
LeDay's younger brother, Seth, currently plays in Iceland for Grindavík. He played college basketball for East Carolina University.

References

External links
 Zach LeDay at draftexpress.com
 Zach LeDay at eurobasket.com
 Zach LeDay at euroleague.net
 Zach LeDay at esake.gr 
 Zach LeDay at sports-reference.com
 

1994 births
Living people
ABA League players
American expatriate basketball people in Greece
American expatriate basketball people in Israel
American expatriate basketball people in Lithuania
American expatriate basketball people in Serbia
American men's basketball players
Basketball players from Dallas
BC Žalgiris players
Centers (basketball)
Hapoel Gilboa Galil Elyon players
KK Partizan players
Olympiacos B.C. players
Power forwards (basketball)
South Florida Bulls men's basketball players
Virginia Tech Hokies men's basketball players